Buay Tuach (born January 20, 1995) is an Ethiopian-American professional basketball player for the Sioux Falls Skyforce of the NBA G League.

Career

Westchester Knicks (2017–2019)
After a short stint in Germany, Tuach was selected by the Long Island Nets in the 2017 NBA G League Draft. He was later waived and subsequently joined the Westchester Knicks. He averaged 2.0 points in 23 games during the 2017–18 season.

Tuach re-joined the Westchester Knicks for the 2018–19 season, but after appearing in two games, he sustained a foot fracture and was waived. He re-joined the Knicks in February 2019. He averaged 2.8 points in 13 games during the 2018–19 season.

London Lions (2020)
On January 10, 2020, Tuach signed with the London Lions in England for the 2019–20 BBL season. He averaged 10.1 points in nine games.

South West Slammers (2022)
In March 2022, Tuach signed with the South West Slammers in Australia for the 2022 NBL1 West season.

Sioux Falls Skyforce (2022)
On October 24, 2022, Tuach joined the Sioux Falls Skyforce training camp roster. However, he did not make the final roster.

References

External links
ESPN Profile
Scout Basketball Profile
LMU Lions bio

1995 births
Living people
American expatriate basketball people in Australia
American expatriate basketball people in the United Kingdom
American men's basketball players
Ethiopian men's basketball players
Junior college men's basketball players in the United States
Loyola Marymount Lions men's basketball players
Shooting guards
Small forwards
Sportspeople from Addis Ababa
Sportspeople from Omaha, Nebraska
Westchester Knicks players